The 2020 ACB Playoffs, also known as 2020 Liga Endesa Playoffs for sponsorship reasons, was the postseason tournament of the ACB's 2019–20 season, which began on 24 September 2019. The playoffs started on 17 June 2020 and ended on 30 June 2020 with the Final. All matches were played behind closed doors.

Real Madrid was the defending champion which was eliminated in group stage by San Pablo Burgos which qualified to semifinals for its first time. Kirolbet Baskonia won their fourth ACB and Spanish title after 10 years of the last Spanish title.

All times were in Central European Summer Time (UTC+02:00)''.

Format
Due to the COVID-19 pandemic, the top 12 teams after round 23 played in the Pavelló Municipal Font de Sant Lluís (Valencia) to win the league. The teams were divided into two groups of six, playing every team in their group once. The top two teams per group qualified for the semifinals. From semifinals onwards, the teams played a single-elimination tournament consisting of two rounds. A total of 33 matches were played within two weeks.

Qualifying
Initially, eight teams would qualify for the playoffs. However, due to the COVID-19 pandemic, the playoffs were expanded to 12 teams after the early ending of the regular season.

Venue
On May 27, 2020, ACB selected and announced Valencia to host the exceptional playoffs in the two last weeks of June. The matches were played in La Fonteta and the teams trained in L'Alqueria del Basket which had 9 indoor courts, 4 outdoor courts and 15,000 square metres.

Group stage
The teams were divided into two groups of six, playing every team in their group once. The top two teams per group qualified for the semifinals. It started on 17 June and ended on 26 June 2020.

Group A

Group B

Final Four
The Final Four was a single-elimination tournament consisting of two rounds. It was played on 28–30 June 2020.

Bracket

Semifinals

Final

References

External links
 Official website 

2020
playoffs
ACBs|Liga ACB